Maurice De Waele (27 December 1896 – 14 February 1952) was a Belgian professional road bicycle racer.

De Waele placed 2nd in the 1927 Tour, an hour and fifty eight minutes Nicolas Frantz and 3rd in 1928, again won by Frantz. However, he is most famous for winning the 1929 Tour de France. He led the Tour until stage seven when two punctures on the way to Bordeaux cost him the yellow jersey to no less than three other rides on the same time in the general classification, Frantz, Andre Leducq and Victor Fontan. Fontan was the sole leader of the race when a broken bike led to his retirement, leaving De Waele in the lead, seventy five seconds ahead of Frantz. However, punctures to De Waele gave the lead to his nearest rival until he too suffered the same problem. With Frantz out of the running for the title, sickness in Grenoble nearly cost him too but with help from his teammates, he was led to victory.

After winning the 1929 Tour, the organiser, Henri Desgrange despaired so much of the trickery that he thought had let such a minor rider succeed that he abandoned commercially sponsored teams and ran the Tour for national teams for two decades. Desgrange had until then insisted that while riders could compete in the name of their sponsors, cooperation or tactics between those riders was not allowed. They were to consider everyone their rival and ride against them whether they had the same sponsor or not.

De Waele was sponsored by the French bicycle company, Alcyon, whose ability to employ many of the leading riders gave it a dominant place in the sport. Clashes between Alcyon and Desgrange were frequent and came to a head when De Waele won the Tour with the illegal help of other Alcyon riders even though he was ill.

"My Tour has been won by a corpse," Desgrange complained and from the following year denied entries to commercial teams and accepted national teams instead.

De Waele finished 5th in 1931.  Other notable wins include the 1928 and 1929 Tour of the Basque Country.

Career achievements

Major results

1927 – Labor-Dunlop
 Tour de France
 2nd overall, @ + 1h 48' 21"
 1st, Stage 2 (Dieppe - Le Havre), 103km
 1st, Stage 13 (Perpignan - Marseille), 360km
1928 – Alcyon-Dunlop
 Tour de France
 3rd overall, @ + 56' 16"
 1st, Stage 8 (Bordeaux - Hendaye), 225km
 1st, Stage 20 (Charleville - Malo-les-Bains), 271km
 1st overall, Tour of the Basque Country
1929 – Belgium
 Tour de France
 1st overall, 5254km in 186h 39' 16" (28.319km/h)
 1st, Stage 20 (Charleville - Malo-les-Bains), 270km
 1st overall, Tour of the Basque Country
1931 – Belgium
 1st overall, Tour of Belgium

Grand Tour results timeline

References

Belgian male cyclists
Tour de France winners
Belgian Tour de France stage winners
1896 births
1952 deaths
Cyclists from East Flanders
People from Lievegem
Belgian cyclo-cross champions